Archizelmiridae is an extinct family of flies, known from the Jurassic and Cretaceous periods. It belongs to the Sciaroidea, and has suggested to have a close relationship with Sciaridae.

Genera 

 Archimelzira Grimaldi et al. 2003 New Jersey amber, Late Cretaceous (Turonian)
 Archizelmira Rohdendorf 1962 Itat Formation, Russia, Middle Jurassic (Bathonian) Karabastau Formation, Kazakhstan, Middle-Late Jurassic (Callovian/Oxfordian) Shar Teeg, Mongolia, Late Jurassic (Tithonian) Zaza Formation, Russia, Early Cretaceous (Aptian)
 Burmazelmira Grimaldi et al. 2003 Spanish amber, Escucha Formation, Early Cretaceous (Albian), Burmese amber, Myanmar, Late Cretaceous (Cenomanian)
 Zelmiarcha Grimaldi et al. 2003 Lebanese amber, Early Cretaceous (Barremian)

References 

Sciaroidea